Tilakpur may refer to these topics-
 Tilakpur: a village Development Community in Nepal
 Tilokpur: a village of Uttar Pradesh, India
 Tilakpur railway station: Tilakpur railway station is a railway station in Akkelpur upazila of joypurhat district. Tilakpur is also a union parishad of Akkelpur upazila